Michael Frederick Gosling (born September 23, 1980) is an American former Major League Baseball (MLB) left-handed pitcher who played for the Arizona Diamondbacks, Cincinnati Reds, and Cleveland Indians from 2004 to 2009.

Amateur career
Gosling was originally drafted by the Minnesota Twins in the 14th round of the 1998 Major League Baseball Draft, but chose to go to college at Stanford University, where he graduated with a degree in Human Biology. In 1999, he played collegiate summer baseball with the Orleans Cardinals of the Cape Cod Baseball League.

Professional career

Arizona Diamondbacks
He was drafted again, by the Arizona Diamondbacks in the 2nd round of the 2001 Major League Baseball Draft.  Gosling began his career in AA with the El Paso Diablos, and led the Texas League in wins in 2002.  After shoulder surgery in 2003, he made his major league debut with the D-backs on September 9, . He went 1–1 with a 4.62 earned run average in six appearances (four starts) for the season. He split  between the Diamondbacks and their AAA affiliate, the Tucson Sidewinders, going 0–3 with a 4.45 ERA in 13 appearances (five starts) for Arizona.

Cincinnati Reds
In , Gosling was selected off waivers by the Cincinnati Reds. He made one appearance with the Reds in 2006, and split  between the Reds and their AAA affiliate, the Louisville Bats, going 2-0 with the Reds. He made 24 total appearances in two seasons for the Reds, and was used exclusively out of the bullpen.

Toronto Blue Jays 
In , Gosling played in the Toronto Blue Jays organization and had a 3.67 ERA for AAA Syracuse. Gosling led the league in appearances and became a free agent at the end of the season.

Minnesota Twins 
In January , Gosling signed a minor league contract with the Minnesota Twins. After going 7-1 out of the bullpen for the Rochester Red Wings, Gosling exercised a June 1 escape clause in his contract to become a free agent.

Cleveland Indians 
On June 5, 2009, Gosling signed a minor league contract with the Cleveland Indians.  He was then called up on June 19  and made 15 appearances for the Indians.

On December 2, 2009, Gosling re-signed with the Cleveland Indians on a minor league contract with an invite to spring training.

On May 17, 2010, Gosling officially announced his retirement before a Columbus Clippers game for Cleveland's AAA minor league affiliate.  He finished his career that night by pitching 6.1 scoreless innings in a spot start against the Durham Bulls.

Life after baseball
In August 2012, Gosling returned to Stanford and enrolled at Stanford Law School.

References

External links

1980 births
Living people
Arizona Diamondbacks players
Cincinnati Reds players
Cleveland Indians players
Louisville Bats players
Major League Baseball pitchers
Baseball players from Wisconsin
Sportspeople from Madison, Wisconsin
Rochester Red Wings players
Syracuse Chiefs players
Tucson Sidewinders players
Orleans Firebirds players
Stanford Cardinal baseball players
Columbus Clippers players
Anchorage Glacier Pilots players